John Schmitt (born May 6, 1962) is an American economist, who serves as a senior economist with the Center for Economic and Policy Research in Washington, DC. He has written extensively on economic inequality, unemployment, the new economy, the welfare state, and other topics for both academic and popular audiences. He has also worked as a consultant for national and international organizations including the American Center for International Labor Solidarity, the Global Policy Network, the International Labour Organization, the United Nations Economic Commission for Latin America, and others.

Schmitt's research has focused primarily on inequality in the US labor market and the role of labor-market institutions in explaining international differences in economic performance, particularly between the United States and Europe. Schmitt has co-authored (with Lawrence Mishel and Jared Bernstein) three editions of The State of Working America(Cornell University Press). He has also contributed to The American Prospect, The Boston Review, Challenge, The Guardian, The International Herald Tribune, The Washington Post, and other newspapers and magazines.

He is also a visiting lecturer at the Pompeu Fabra University (Barcelona) and has been an academic visitor at the Universidad Centroamericana "Jose Simeon Cañas" (San Salvador, El Salvador). He has an undergraduate degree from the Woodrow Wilson School of Public and International Affairs at Princeton University and an M.Sc. and Ph.D. in economics from the London School of Economics.

References
Bio of John Schmitt at CEPR
Papers by John Schmitt for CEPR
Op-Eds and Columns by John Schmitt
Bio and Publications by John Schmitt at Economic Policy Institute

Notes

External links
Marketplace (Audio): Stimulus Plans to Create, Save Jobs, February 12, 2009
NPR (Audio): Big Three Automakers Take Their Case to Capitol Hill, November 18, 2008
Public News Service (Audio): Report: Next Generation VA Workers Not "Movin' On Up", October 30, 2008
Uprising Radio Interview (Audio): Are We Better Off Now Than Eight Years Ago?, September 29, 2008

1962 births
21st-century American economists
Alumni of the London School of Economics
Center for Economic and Policy Research
Living people
Princeton School of Public and International Affairs alumni